Shankar Dada is a 1976 Bollywood film directed by Shibu Mitra. It stars Ashok Kumar, Shashi Kapoor, Neetu Singh, Pran in pivotal roles and music was composed by Sonik Omi.

Cast
Ashok Kumar as Police Superintendent 
Shashi Kapoor as Inspector Ram Singh / Shankar Singh "Shankar Dada" (Double Role) 
Neetu Singh as Roopa Verma
Bindu as Bindiya 
Pran as Inspector Amar Singh 
Anjali Kadam as Mrs. Shanta Singh 
Mohan Choti as Porter
Roopesh Kumar as Moti 
Anwar Hussain as Babu Dada "Babubhai" 
Rajan Haksar as Lakhan Singh

Songs

External links
 

1976 films
1970s Hindi-language films
Films scored by Sonik-Omi
Films directed by Shibu Mitra
Cultural depictions of Jawaharlal Nehru